Rotava is a town in Sokolov District in the Karlovy Vary Region of the Czech Republic. It has about 2,800 inhabitants.

Administrative parts
The village of Smolná is an administrative part of Rotava.

Twin towns – sister cities

Rotava is twinned with:
 Veitshöchheim, Germany

References

External links

Cities and towns in the Czech Republic
Populated places in Sokolov District